Udunga (Üdenge) is a rural locality (an ulus) in Selenginsky District, Republic of Buryatia, Russia. The population was 76 as of 2010. There are 4 streets.

Geography 
Udunga is located 80 km southwest of Gusinoozyorsk (the district's administrative centre) by road. Ust-Urma is the nearest rural locality.

References 

Rural localities in Selenginsky District